The Monroe Monitor and Valley News was a weekly newspaper published in Monroe, Washington, United States. It had an estimated circulation of 4,000 in 2013. It was also one of the first within the state.

History 
When B. F. Smyth founded the Monroe Monitor in January, 1899 it was the community's first newspaper. Since its inception, the newspaper had been continuous circulation. Following the successful development of the Monroe Monitor & Valley News, other weekly newspapers were born, only to quietly disappear or merge with the Monitor. Its first issue was published on Saturday January 14, 1899, and has had ten publishers throughout its duration. The paper was part of the penny press era, and subscriptions cost $1.00 per year. H. D. Matthews purchased the paper in 1908 and merged it with the Transcript, renaming the publication the Monroe Monitor-Transcript; "Transcript" was dropped from the title eight years later.

In the 1960s it was part of a consortium of five newspapers in Snohomish County that collaborated to produce a 12-page supplement.

The paper's final title was adopted in 1985 when then-owner Voland Publications acquired the Valley News from neighboring Sultan. (It was previously known as the Sultan Star.) Jerry Robinson of Seattle purchased the paper in 1993, and later sold it to RIM Publications.  The paper was acquired in January 2015 by Pacific Publishing Company, which merged it with the Snohomish County Tribune in November 2021.

Former names of the newspaper 

 Monroe Monitor 1899 - 1909  
 Monroe Monitor-Transcript 1909 - 1916 
 Monroe Independent 1916 - 1917 
 The Monroe Monitor 1917 - 1918 
 Monroe Independent 1918 - 1919 
 The Monroe Monitor 1919 - 1921 
 Monroe Independent 1921 - 1924 
 Consolidated with the Monroe Independent on January 5, 1923
 The Monroe Monitor 1924 - 1985 and then merged with Valley News in 1985.

Further reading
 1916 edition of Editor & Publisher
 1979 edition of Editor & Publisher (lighthearted mention in discussion of papers with alliterative names)
 Index of newspapers on microfilm from 1984

References

External links 
 Official website

Monroe, Washington
Newspapers published in Washington (state)
Defunct newspapers published in Washington (state)